István Gyenesei (born 1 April 1948) is a Hungarian politician and the Chairman of the Association for Somogy party. He was the only representative in the Hungarian National Assembly who gained a seat as an independent. During the formation of the minority government in April 2008, Prime Minister Ferenc Gyurcsány appointed him as Minister of Local Government. He did not get a post in the cabinet of Gordon Bajnai in 2009.

He has several children. The youngest daughter, Leila Gyenesei, is a pentathlete who participated in the 2006 Winter Olympics and 2008 Summer Olympics.

References
MTI Ki Kicsoda 2009, Magyar Távirati Iroda Zrt., Budapest, 2008, 409. old., ISSN 1787-288X
Gyenesei országgyűlési adatlapja

1948 births
Living people
People from Kaposvár
Members of the Hungarian Socialist Workers' Party
Hungarian Interior Ministers
Members of the National Assembly of Hungary (2006–2010)